Thomas Alfred Wise (March 23, 1865 - March 21, 1928) was an American actor and president of The Lambs from 1926 to 1928.

Biography
Wise was born on March 23, 1865 in Faversham, England. He emigrated to the United States at the age of three, and made his stage debut in Dixon, California]in 1883 at a variety show.

He married Gertrude Whitty (1864–1929) on November 11, 1895 in Cuyahoga, Ohio.

Wise died on March 21, 1928 in Manhattan, New York City.

Performances
 Are You a Mason? (1901)
 The Little Cherub (1906)
 Miss Hook of Holland (1907)
 A Gentleman from Mississippi (1908)
 An Old New Yorker (1911)
 The Silver Wedding (1913)
 The Song of Songs (1914)
 Caliban of the Yellow Sands (1916)
 Cappy Ricks (1919)
 Behold This Dreamer (1927)

Filmography
Blue Grass (1915)

References

External links

1865 births
1928 deaths
Members of The Lambs Club
The Lambs presidents
British emigrants to the United States
People from Faversham